The First Mexican Empire, established in 1821, with Agustín de Iturbide proclaimed as Emperor in 1822, was abolished in 1823.

In 1863, the Second Mexican Empire was established after a plebiscite that confirmed the latest proclamation of the empire. Archduke Maximilian of Austria consented to accept the Imperial Crown of Mexico in October 1863 and officially on 10 April 1864 under the regnal name of Maximilian I of Mexico. Maximilian and his wife Carlota, having no issue of their own, adopted two of Agustín de Iturbide's grandsons, Agustín de Iturbide y Green and Salvador de Iturbide y de Marzán, who were granted each the (non-hereditary) title Prince de Iturbide with the style of Highness by an imperial decree of 16 September 1865, and were ranked next in line after the reigning family. However, Maximilian never intended to give the crown to the Iturbides (like Napoléon I did with his stepson Eugène de Beauharnais) and it was all a charade directed at his brother Archduke Karl Ludwig of Austria, as Maximilian explained himself that "either Karl Ludwig would give him one of his sons as an heir, or else he would bequeath everything to his Iturbide adopted children" as a last resort.

Upon the abolition of the Second Mexican Empire and the execution of Emperor Maximilian I in 1867, pretense to the Mexican Crown  by the said adopted heirs.

The current pretender to the Mexican throne, in right of both the First and Second Empires, is Count Maximilian von Götzen-Iturbide, great-grandson of Salvador de Iturbide y de Marzán.

List of claimants to the Mexican throne

See also 
 Prince Imperial of Mexico
 First Mexican Empire
 Second Mexican Empire
 History of Mexico
 House of Iturbide

References

External links 
 Imperial House of Mexico

Pretenders to the Mexican throne
Mexico history-related lists

Mexican Empire